Although there are no major league professional franchises based in South Carolina, the state does have numerous minor league teams. The Carolina Panthers and Carolina Hurricanes major league pro teams representing both North Carolina and South Carolina, are based in neighboring North Carolina. The Carolina Panthers, the professional American football team of the National Football League based in Charlotte, North Carolina, has training facilities in Rock Hill, South Carolina. College teams throughout the state represent their particular South Carolina institution, along with the state being a prime destination for golf and water sports.

Table
The following table shows the sports teams in South Carolina that average over 8,000 fans per home game:

College sports
College sports — particularly college football — are very big in South Carolina. The University of South Carolina's Gamecocks and Clemson University's Tigers regularly draw more than 80,000 spectators at the schools' home football games, placing them among the top twenty schools in average attendance. Their rivalry is called the Battle of the Palmetto State. Clemson's football team won the National Championship in 1981, 2016 and 2018.  Both South Carolina's and Clemson's baseball teams are consistently ranked.  The Gamecocks won the national title in 2010 and 2011. The South Carolina men's and women's basketball teams both made the Final Four of their respective tournaments in 2017, with the women winning the national title. South Carolina's women's basketball team won a second national title 2022.

Clemson and South Carolina are the two most prominent of the state's 11 NCAA Division I members. They are the only two schools that are members of the so-called Power Five conferences, the most prominent leagues in the top level of American college football, the Football Bowl Subdivision (FBS).

The Tigers additionally have an ice hockey team that competes at club level in the South Division of the Atlantic Coastal Conference.

Clemson is a charter member of the Atlantic Coast Conference, and South Carolina is in the Southeastern Conference. The Coastal Carolina Chanticleers are the state's newest FBS program, having completed a transition from the Football Championship Subdivision (FCS) in 2018. Coastal, whose baseball team won the College World Series in 2016, joined the Sun Belt Conference for non-football sports the day after it won the CWS, joined Sun Belt football in 2017, and became full FBS members in 2018. Six other schools that play Division I football are full members of FCS conferences. The Citadel Bulldogs, Furman Paladins, and Wofford Terriers are all in the Southern Conference; the Charleston Southern Buccaneers are members of the Big South Conference; and the South Carolina State Bulldogs compete in the Mid-Eastern Athletic Conference. The Presbyterian Blue Hose played their final season of Big South football in 2019; they remain Big South members in non-football sports, but the football team played the 2020 season as an FCS independent before joining the single-sport Pioneer Football League in 2021. Finally, three schools are full members of Division I conferences but do not sponsor football. The Charleston Cougars compete in the Colonial Athletic Association, and the USC Upstate Spartans and Winthrop Eagles compete in the Big South.

Major league
South Carolina has no major professional franchise of the NFL, NHL, NBA, MLS, or MLB located in the state; however the NFL's Carolina Panthers (based in Charlotte, North Carolina), the NBA's Charlotte Hornets (based in Charlotte, North Carolina), the NHL's Carolina Hurricanes (based in Raleigh, North Carolina), and MLS' Charlotte FC (based in Charlotte, North Carolina) represent both North and South Carolina. In addition, the Panthers played their first season in Clemson, and maintain training facilities at Wofford College in Spartanburg.

Minor league
There are numerous minor league teams that are either based in the state, or play much of their schedule within its borders. The Charlotte Knights, a Class AAA minor league baseball team, played at a stadium in Fort Mill, South Carolina, just across the border from Charlotte until the team moved to a new ballpark in Uptown Charlotte in 2014. Currently, five teams play in the state, all at the Class A level. The Greenville Drive plays in the High-A South Atlantic League, and the Augusta GreenJackets (in North Augusta), Charleston RiverDogs, Columbia Fireflies, and Myrtle Beach Pelicans play in the Low-A  Carolina League.

For a state where natural ice is a rarity, professional ice hockey has been popular in a number of areas of the state since the 1990s. Though four teams competed at one time in South Carolina, the ECHL (formerly called the East Coast Hockey League) currently oversees operations of only two franchises, the Greenville Swamp Rabbits and the South Carolina Stingrays. The Stingrays play in the North Charleston Coliseum, located in North Charleston.

Another minor league franchise is the Charleston Battery, playing in the USL Championship at the second level of American men's soccer. The team plays in the soccer-specific Patriots Point Soccer Complex, located in Mount Pleasant. The American Basketball Association currently oversees operations of only three semi-pro basketball franchises, the South Carolina Warriors which are based in Myrtle Beach, the Greenville Galaxy which are based in Greenville, and the Palmetto State Rizers which are based in Columbia.

NASCAR racing

NASCAR racing was born in the South, and South Carolina has in the past hosted some very important NASCAR races, at the Darlington Raceway. Darlington Raceway plays host to NASCAR's Labor Day weekend classic, the Southern 500. The Whelen, Xfinity Series, and Cup Series cars all race at Darlington.

Golf
South Carolina is a popular golf destination. With nearly one hundred golf courses, the Grand Strand region has more public golf courses per capita than any other place in the country. Some have hosted PGA and LGPA events in the past, but most have been designed for the casual golfer.

Hilton Head Island & Kiawah Island have several very nice golf courses and host professional events every year. The RBC Heritage known for much of its history as the Heritage Classic or simply the Heritage, is a PGA Tour event in The Sea Pines Plantation, Hilton Head Island, South Carolina, first played 50 years ago in 1969. It is currently played in mid-April, the week after The Masters in Augusta, Georgia.

The upstate of South Carolina also has many nice golf courses, most of the nicer courses are private including the Cliff's courses and Cross Creek Plantation (the Cliff's courses host the annual BMW PRO/AM that brings many celebrities and professionals to South Carolina. Cross Creek Plantation located in Seneca, also private hosted a PGA Qualifier in the 90's). In 2007, The Ocean Course, the signature course of the Kiawah Island Golf Resort, was ranked #1 in Golf Digest magazine's "America's 50 Toughest Golf Courses" and #38 on their "America's 100 Greatest Golf Courses".

Water sports
Water sports are also an extremely popular activity in South Carolina. With a long coast line, South Carolina has many different beach activities such as surfing, boogie boarding, deep sea fishing, and shrimping. The Pee Dee region of the state offers exceptional fishing. Some of the largest catfish ever caught were caught in the Santee Lakes. The Upstate of South Carolina also offers outstanding water activities, especially in Lakes Hartwell, Jocassee, and Keowee. The Midlands region also offers water-based recreation revolving around Lakes Marion and Murray and such rivers as the Congaree, Saluda, Broad, and Edisto.including water skiing and swimming

Roller Sports
Following the rebirth of roller derby in the early 2000s and the release of the movie Whip It, South Carolina has seen the rise over several roller derby leagues. As of 2014 there are four leagues sanctioned under WFTDA each of which are located in Columbia, Charleston, and Greenville.

Misc. Sports
While there are no race tracks with betting in South Carolina, there is significant horse training activity, particularly in Aiken and Camden, which hold steeplechase races.

Professional bass fishing tournaments are also found in South Carolina. Lake Hartwell, Lake Wylie, and Lake Murray both host Bassmaster Classic tournaments.

Spartanburg, South Carolina, is also the home of the national evangelical sports program Upward Sports.

See also
Sports in Columbia, South Carolina
South Carolina Gamecocks (University of South Carolina teams)
Clemson Tigers (Clemson University teams)
Sports in Sumter, South Carolina

References

External links